Quentin Palfrey (born April 29, 1974) is an American lawyer, policymaker, and political candidate. He currently serves as Deputy General Counsel at the United States Department of Commerce. He previously served as the Executive Director of the Abdul Latif Jameel Poverty Action Lab (J-PAL) North America and is the Co-Director of the Global Access in Action project at the Berkman Klein Center for Internet & Society.

During President Obama’s first term, Palfrey worked as Senior Advisor for Jobs & Competitiveness in the White House Office of Science and Technology Policy. In that role, he served as lead policy staffer on reform efforts and also coordinated White House input into a report to Congress on the national strategy for innovation and competitiveness. He has written and spoken widely on innovation, poverty, and evidence-based policy.

Palfrey was the Democratic candidate in the 2018 Massachusetts election for lieutenant governor, running with gubernatorial candidate Jay Gonzalez against the incumbents, Governor Charlie Baker and Lieutenant Governor Karyn Polito of the Republican Party. The Baker/Polito ticket won the November general election by a margin of 1,781,341 votes to 885,770 cast for the Democrats.

Early life and education
Palfrey grew up in Southborough, Massachusetts. His parents, Judith Palfrey and Sean Palfrey, are pediatricians who work in Boston. He has one brother, John Palfrey, who works as an educator, and one sister, Katy, who works in nonprofit conservation. Palfrey is the great-great-grandson of United States President Theodore Roosevelt.

Palfrey attended Phillips Exeter Academy, and graduated from Harvard College in 1996 and Harvard Law School in 2002.

Career
After graduating from law school, Palfrey served as a law clerk for Judge Max Rosenn on the U.S. Court of Appeals for the Third Circuit. After a brief stint as a litigation associate at the New York office of Cravath, Swaine & Moore, Palfrey returned to Boston to serve as an Assistant Attorney General and later as the first Chief of the Health Care Division in the Office of the Massachusetts Attorney General. During the 2008 Presidential campaign, Palfrey served as the voter protection director for President Obama’s campaign in Ohio.

Palfrey also served as Deputy General Counsel for Strategic Initiatives at the US Department of Commerce. As the first Chief of the Health Care Division in the Office of the Massachusetts Attorney General, Palfrey oversaw multi-million dollar consumer protection litigation and investigations relating to health insurance, pharmaceuticals, medical devices, healthcare providers and nursing homes. Prior to his Chief position, he was an Assistant Attorney General in the Insurance Division.

2018 Massachusetts lieutenant gubernatorial campaign

In September 2017, Palfrey announced his campaign for lieutenant governor of Massachusetts, stating that "we need leaders who will fight for good jobs and fair pay, work to reduce inequality and poverty, and stand up against attacks on our diverse and inclusive American values." On June 2, 2018, Palfrey was endorsed at the Massachusetts State Democratic Convention. In the Democratic primary election held on September 4, 2018, Palfrey defeated Jimmy Tingle. Palfrey was defeated by Republican incumbent Karyn Polito in the general election held on November 6, 2018.

Biden administration 
On January 21, 2021, Palfrey was sworn in by U.S. President Joe Biden to serve as Deputy General Counsel at the United States Department of Commerce. For some time served as acting general counsel while in this position.

2022 Massachusetts attorney general campaign

Palfrey sought the Democratic nomination for attorney general of Massachusetts in 2022. He announced his candidacy in February 2022. In June 2022, he won the party's endorsement at its state convention. However, in August 2022, before the primary election, Palfrey withdrew his candidacy and endorsed Andrea Campbell.

Personal life

Palfrey married Anna Tabor in 2008. They have one daughter and two sons.

Palfrey's father was born John Gorham Palfrey, III, and is a 1967 graduate of Harvard, as is his mother, born Judith Swarm Sullivan. His father is also considered John Gorham Palfrey, IV or John Palfrey, VI. He had a younger brother who didn't live for a day (December 5, 1946) and a younger sister, Antonia Ford Palfrey, named for their 3rd great-grandmother, Antonia (nee Ford) Willard.

Quentin's 3rd great-grandfather is John G. Palfrey (1796-1881), Massachusetts politician. His 2nd great-grandfather, John Carver Palfrey (1833-1906), served in the United States Civil War, as did his 3rd great-uncle, Francis Winthrop Palfrey (1831-1889). His great-grandfather, John Gorham Palfrey II (1875-1945) was an 1896 graduate of Harvard and a lawyer in Boston. His grandfather, John Gorham Palfrey, Jr. or the III (1919-1979), was a 1940 graduate of Harvard, served in World War II, was appointed to the Atomic Energy Commission by President John F. Kennedy, and was a professor at Columbia University from 1952 until his death in 1979 as well as dean of Columbia College from 1958 to 1962.

His grandmother was Belle Wyatt Roosevelt Palfrey (1919-1985), a daughter of Kermit Roosevelt, sister of Kermit Roosevelt Jr., sister of Joseph Willard Roosevelt, granddaughter of Theodore Roosevelt, first cousin, once removed of Eleanor Roosevelt, and fifth cousin, twice removed of Franklin D. Roosevelt. His 2nd great-grandfather was Joseph Edward Willard, lieutenant governor of Virginia and United States Ambassador to Spain.

Through his Roosevelt side, his first cousin, once removed is Mark Roosevelt; second cousin is Kermit Roosevelt III; and his 2nd great-uncle was Quentin Roosevelt.

Publications
 Expanding Access to Medications & Promoting Innovation: A Practical Approach, 24 Geo. J. on Poverty L. & Pol'y 161 (2017) 
 State Judiciary’s Role in Fulfilling Brown’s Promise, 8 Mich. J. Race & Law 1 (2002)
 Federal Housing Subsidies, 37 Harv. J. Legis. 567 (2000)

References

External links
Campaign website

1974 births
Cravath, Swaine & Moore people
United States Department of Commerce officials
Office of Science and Technology Policy officials
Harvard Law School alumni
Living people
Massachusetts Democrats
Massachusetts lawyers
People from Southborough, Massachusetts
Phillips Exeter Academy alumni